James Lansdale Hodson (1891–1956) was a British novelist, scriptwriter and journalist. He was a war correspondent and northern editor of the Daily Mail.

Born in Bury, Lancashire in 1891, Hodson worked as a war correspondent during World War II, and he wrote a war diary that was published by Victor Gollancz as a series of 7 books; Through the Dark Night, Towards the Morning, Before Daybreak, 'War in the Sun, Home Front, And Yet I like America and The Sea and the Land. He also wrote the official British film Desert Victory. He toured the United States from 1943-44, writing And Yet I Like America on his return. His 1952 novel Morning Star had as its theme the freedom of the press in England. His novel Return To The Wood (1955) became a play Hamp (by John Wilson) and then a film King & Country (1964, directed by Joseph Losey and starring Dirk Bogarde).

He died aged 65 on 28 August 1956 at Lewisham Hospital.

References

External links
 
 
 James Landsale Hodson at Goodreads
 James Lansdale Hodson at the National Portrait Gallery

1891 births
1956 deaths
People from Bury, Greater Manchester
20th-century British novelists
British male journalists
War correspondents of World War II
British war correspondents
British male novelists
20th-century British male writers
Officers of the Order of the British Empire